DreamCatcher Interactive Inc. (also known as DreamCatcher Games) was a Canadian video game publisher founded in 1996 by Richard Wah Kan. It was best known for its adventure games. In 2006, the company became a subsidiary of JoWooD Entertainment. In 2011, the company went into administration along with its parent JoWooD and all assets were purchased by Nordic Games Holding. The DreamCatcher Interactive brand is currently being used as a publishing label for THQ Nordic.

History
DreamCatcher Interactive was founded in 1996 at Toronto, Canada. Its first published title was Jewels of the Oracle. The company gradually drifted into becoming a publisher focused on the adventure genre after finding that "customers really were hungry for" these titles, according to DreamCatcher's Marshall Zwicker. Beyond Time was among the releases whose reception drew the publisher to this field. Profit reported that DreamCatcher located such projects via "networking at tradeshows and reviewing unsolicited game proposals." In 1999, DreamCatcher pushed its corporate strategy by launching Nightlong: Union City Conspiracy, The Forgotten: It Begins and The Crystal Key. The latter went on to  a major hit. DreamCatcher's top four titles for 2000 were Dracula: Resurrection, Traitors Gate, Beyond Atlantis and The Crystal Key. These games respectively made up 9%, 14%, 15% and 32% of DreamCatcher's sales that year. In March 2000, DreamCatcher was purchased by Cryo Interactive. Continuing the company's growth, in November 2000, DreamCatcher signed with Her Interactive to publish the Nancy Drew franchise.

In late 2002, most of the assets and development teams of French-based publisher, Cryo Interactive were absorbed by DreamCatcher Interactive, forming the base for DreamCatcher Europe including key offices and a large internal studio. By early 2003, DreamCatcher was the United States' tenth-biggest publisher of games. After the acquisition of Cryo Interactive, Dreamcatcher created a publishing division called The Adventure Company in early 2003. The company also partnered with both Wanadoo Edition and Microïds, as well as other studios in the development and distribution of games including Syberia, Still Life and ObsCure. In 2005, the main Microïds studio was acquired by Ubisoft with Dreamcatcher retaining publishing rights to the games being created.

The Adventure Company brand label under DreamCatcher has released many adventure game series' including series' based on Agatha Christie novels. They also recently signed to release a series of titles based on The Hardy Boys. Outside of adventure gaming, DreamCatcher is best known for publishing the first-person shooter Painkiller developed with People Can Fly. Painkiller became a commercial success and was signed with the CPL World Tour 2005. Dreamcatcher would also create another label, Silverline Software, around 2004 for the distribution of some non-core games and the publishing of utility software. Silverline Software would release the "Time to Ride" series of girl's horse games starting in 2004, which would later be acquired by Ubisoft.

In 2006, JoWooD Entertainment announced the purchase of DreamCatcher Games as a way of increasing their presence into the North American gaming market in addition to acquiring the company's key titles and licenses. Since the acquisition, DreamCatcher Games has continued to launch titles both under The Adventure Company and DreamCatcher labels including new games created by JoWooD like the SpellForce series. In 2011, JoWooD went into administration causing DreamCatcher to file for bankruptcy. In November 2011, Nordic Games Holding announced that they had acquired all DreamCatcher assets and would be turning it into a publishing label of their subsidiary Nordic Games. Nordic Games Holding had previously acquired JoWooD and The Adventure Company in August also turning both brands into publishing labels of Nordic Games. All business operations of this brand are being conducted out of THQ Nordic in Vienna, Austria.

Games
''Note: This list is for titles which DreamCatcher Interactive published. Releases of games under The Adventure Company banner are not included.

References

External links
 (archived)

1996 establishments in Ontario
2011 disestablishments in Ontario
Canadian companies established in 1996
Canadian companies disestablished in 2011
Companies based in Toronto
Defunct companies of Ontario
Defunct video game companies of Canada
THQ Nordic
Video game companies established in 1996
Video game companies disestablished in 2011
Video game publishers